Events in the year 1905 in Norway.

Overview 
1905 is the year when Norway regained its independence after the dissolution of the Union between Sweden and Norway.  For the first time since 1397 Norway had a national king, after 500 years of political unions with other Scandinavia countries — the Kalmar Union until 1532, then  the united kingdoms of Denmark-Norway until 1814, and finally a  personal union with Sweden until 1905. The article Dissolution of the union between Norway and Sweden in 1905 covers the events surrounding the break with Sweden in depth.

Incumbents
Monarch – Oscar II (until October 26),  Vacant (October 26 to November 18),  Haakon VII (after November 18)
Prime Minister: Francis Hagerup (until 11 March), then Christian Michelsen

Events
 15 January – A major rockfall hit the lake Loenvatnet in Sogn og Fjordane, creating a  flood wave that destroyed the villages of Ytre Nesdal and Bødal, killing 61 people.
 7 June – The Norwegian Parliament declares the union with Sweden dissolved, and Norway achieves full independence
 23 September – Norway and Sweden sign the "Karlstad treaty", peacefully dissolving the Union between the two countries.
 16 October – Union resolution for 1905 : After the warmongering and hard negotiations was the Norwegian union with Sweden formally dissolved when the Swedish parliament recognized Norway as a separate state.
 26 October – Norway was recognized by Sweden as an independent constitutional monarchy.
 12 November – a referendum confirmed the monarchy and rejected a republican form of government.
 18 November – The Norwegian Parliament unanimously elected the Danish Prince Carl to be king (which was named King Haakon VII).
 25 November – Haakon VII and his family arrived in Christiania (present-day Oslo).
 2 December – Norsk hydro-elektrisk Kvælstofaktieselskab, later known simply as Norsk Hydro, is founded

Popular culture

Sports

Music

Film

Literature
 The Knut Hamsund novel Stridende Liv. Skildringer fra Vesten og Østen was published.
 The last Alexander Kielland essay, Omkring Napoleon (On Napoleon), was published.

Births

January to March
1 January – Kaare Sundby, engineer, resistance member, executed (died 1945)
1 January – Lise Lindbæk, war correspondent (died 1961)
6 January – Asbjørn Listerud, politician (died 1981)
15 January – Marius Sandvei, linguist, educator and language politician (died 1993).
17 January – Øivind Jensen, boxer (died 1989)
23 January – Torger Hovi, politician (died 1980)
7 February – Erling Fredriksfryd, politician (died 1977)
19 February – Birger Halvorsen, high jumper (died 1976)
22 February – Elling Enger, composer, organist, and choir conductor (died 1979)
4 March – Per Mørch Hansson, businessman (died 1994).
10 March – Tormod Normann, lawyer, competitive swimmer and sports administrator (died 1974).

April to June
4 April – Arne Randers Heen, mountain climber (died 1991).
8 April – Bernt Evensen, speed skater, Olympic gold medallist and racing cyclist (died 1979)
12 April – Inger Hagerup, author, playwright and poet (died 1985)
13 April – Edgar Christensen, boxer (died 1977)
20 April – Sigurd Marcussen, politician
28 April – Ernst Fredrik Eckhoff, judge (died 1997)
30 April – Martin Skaaren, politician (died 1999)
4 May – Sverre Offenberg Løberg, politician (died 1976)
12 May – Arna Vågen, missionary and politician (died 2005)
18 May – Art Jorgens, baseball player in America (died 1980)
29 June – Andreas Honerød, politician (died 1965)

July to September
 

3 July – Harald Kihle, painter and illustrator (died 1997).
11 July – Tidemann Flaata Evensen, politician (died 1969)
20 August – Hans Vinjarengen, skier, Olympic silver medallist and World Champion (died 1984)
15 August – Christian Brinch, civil servant.
3 September – Nils Kristian Lysø, politician and Minister (died 1977)
5 September – Gunnar Kalrasten, politician (died 1964)
22 September – Haakon Lie, politician (died 2009)

October to December
11 October – Jens Arup Seip, historian (died 1992)
20 October – Armand Carlsen, speed skater and world record holder (died 1969)
23 October – Kaleb Nytrøen, police officer (died 1994).
24 October – Kristian Hauger, pianist, orchestra leader and composer (died 1977).
22 November – Einar Kristian Haugen, politician (died 1968)
11 December – Willy Røgeberg, rifle shooter and Olympic gold medallist (died 1969)
14 December – Arne Rustadstuen, Nordic skier, Olympic bronze medallist and World Champion (died 1978).

Full date unknown
Trygve Brodahl, cross country skier (died 1996)
Henrik Edland, veterinarian (died 1984)
Håkon Flood, professor of inorganic chemistry (died 2001)
Sven Oftedal, politician and Minister (died 1948)
Erik Rolfsen, architect (died 1992)
Jacob Vaage, historian and museum curator (died 1994)

Deaths
6 February – Niels Mathias Rye, politician (born 1824)
15 March – Amalie Skram, author and feminist (born 1846)

See also

References

External links

 
Norway
Norway